Clifford Holroyde Specialist SEN College is a special educational needs college in the district of Knotty Ash in the city of Liverpool, Merseyside. It caters for boys aged 11–16 who have statements of special educational needs relating to behavioural, emotional and social difficulties.

The school was inspected in 2014 and judged Good.

References

External links 
 School website

Special schools in Liverpool
Special secondary schools in England
Community schools in Liverpool

Specialist SEN colleges in England